This is the list of awards and nominations received by the television series Gilmore Girls (2000–2007).

American Film Institute

ALMA Awards

Emmy Awards

Family Television Awards

Golden Globe Awards

Gracie Allen Awards

Goldderby TV Awards

International Press Academy

Hollywood Makeup Artist and Hair Stylist Guild Awards

Motion Picture Sound Editors

MediaVillage TV Fan Awards

People's Choice Awards

Satellite Awards

Screen Actors Guild

Teen Choice Awards

Television Critics Association Awards

Young Artist Awards

Viewers for Quality Television

References

External links
 Awards won by Gilmore Girls at IMDb

Gilmore Girls
Awards